New Faces of 1952 is a musical revue with songs and comedy skits. It ran on Broadway for nearly a year in 1952 and was then made into a motion picture in 1954. It helped launch the careers of several young performers including Paul Lynde, Alice Ghostley, Eartha Kitt, Robert Clary, Carol Lawrence, Ronny Graham, performer/writer Mel Brooks (as Melvin Brooks), and lyricist Sheldon Harnick.

It is also the source of several popular songs that have continued to be recorded, including "Monotonous", sung by Eartha Kitt in the show and identified with her throughout her career; "Guess Who I Saw Today", sung by June Carroll in the show and subsequently recorded my numerous singers; and "Love is a Simple Thing", sung in the show by Rosemary O'Reilly, Robert Clary, Eartha Kitt, and June Carroll and recorded by the Sauter-Finegan Orchestra, Debbie Reynolds, Arthur Siegel, Jane Morgan, Carmen McRae and the Muppets.<ref> Original Cast, ‘’Leonard Stillman's "New Faces of 1952",RCA Victor LOC 1002 LP</ref>

Broadway production
The revue opened on Broadway at the Royale Theatre on May 16, 1952, and ran for 365 performances.  It was produced by Leonard Sillman, directed by John Murray Anderson and John Beal with choreography by Richard Barstow. The sketches were written by Graham and Brooks. The songs were composed by, among others, Harnick, Graham, Murray Grand and Arthur Siegel. The cast featured Graham, Kitt, Clary, Virginia Bosler, June Carroll, Virginia De Luce, Ghostley, Patricia Hammerlee, Lawrence, Lynde and Bill Milliken. De Luce and Graham won the 1952 Theatre World Award. The revue marked Kitt's Broadway debut, singing a "sultry rendition" of "Monotonous", about how boring a life of luxury was.

The Equity Library Theater, New York City, presented an Off-Broadway revival in 1982, directed by Joseph Patton and featuring comedic performances by Lillian Graff, Philip Wm. Mckinley, Alan Safier, and Randy Brenner in the roles originated by Ghostley, Lynde, Graham, and Clary, respectively. Kitt joined the cast late in the run to re-create her original role.

Another New Faces, the New Faces of 1956 ran on Broadway from June 14, 1956 through December 22, 1956. It was also conceived and produced by Sillman, with direction by David Tihmar and Paul Lynde (sketches). There were five other "New Faces" in all: 1934, 1936, 1943, 1962, and 1968. According to Kay Green, of the seven "New Faces" revues, the 1952 revue was the "most admired, both for the talent of the performers and the cleverness of the writing.

Songs (Broadway)

Act I
 Opening (Ronny Graham, Peter DeVries) and Company
 Lucky Pierre (Ronny Graham) - Pierre (Robert Clary), Reporter and Chorus
 Guess Who I Saw Today (Elisse Boyd, Murray Grand) - June Carroll
 Restoration Piece - Lady Sylvia Malpractice, Simple, Sir Solemnity Sourpuss and Sir Militant Malpractice
 Love Is a Simple Thing (lyrics by June Carroll, music by Arthur Siegel) - Rosemary O'Reilly, Eartha Kitt, Robert Clary, June Carroll
 Boston Beguine (Sheldon Harnick) - Alice Ghostley
 Nanty Puts Her Hair Up (Herbert Farjeon, Siegel) - Nanty, Father, Mother, Brother and Highlander
 Time for Tea  (Carroll-Siegel) - Marcella, Lavinia, Lavinia, the Girl, Marcella, the Girl, Mother, Father, John and Guest
 Bal Petit Bal (Francis Lemarque) - Eartha Kitt, Robert Clary
 Three for the Road, medley: It's Raining Memories/Waltzing in Venice/Take Off That Mask (Graham)

Act II
 Don't Fall Asleep (Graham) - Wife and Husband 
 After Canasta--What? - Dorothy and Elsie 
 Lizzie Borden (Michael Brown) - Townsperson, Man, Judge, Lizzie and District Attorney 
 I'm in Love with Miss Logan (Graham) - Boy, Miss Logan and Man 
 Trip of the Month  - The Explorer   
 Penny Candy (Carroll, Siegel) - Woman, Gussie, Poor Kid, Rich Kid and Candy Vendor
 Convention Bound
 Whither America? (Another Revival?) - Switchboard Operator, Stenographer and Man 
 Monotonous (Carroll, Siegel) - (Sung by Eartha Kitt)
 The Great American Opera - Toby, Madame Flora and Effie 
 He Takes Me Off His Income Tax (Siegel, Carroll) - Virginia de Luce. Song begun, then interrupted four times throughout the show, before 1) Boston Beguine, 2) Nanty Puts Her Hair Up, 3) Three for the Road medley, and 4) I'm in Love with Miss Logan. 

Sketches
"Of Fathers and Sons", written by Mel Brooks, was a parody of the Arthur Miller drama Death of a Salesman with characters Mae, Harry, Stanley and Policeman; a pickpocket is angry with his son for not wanting to join the family business. In "Oedipus Goes South", Ronny Graham parodies Truman Capote. Paul Lynde, wrapped in bandages, bemoans his African safari. The narrative ballad "Guess Who I Saw Today" has June Carroll telling her husband that she saw him with another woman. In "The Bard and the Beard" the characters- Miss Leigh, Sir Laurence, Call Boy and Maid- try to remember what play they are supposed to be in.

 Film New Faces 

Retitled New Faces, the film version was directed by Harry Horner in Cinemascope and Eastmancolor, and released by Twentieth Century Fox on March 6, 1954. Ronny Graham, Eartha Kitt, Robert Clary, Alice Ghostley, June Carroll, Virginia De Luce, Carol Lawrence, Patricia Hammerlee, Paul Lynde, and Bill Millikin repeated their stage roles. The film was basically a reproduction of the stage revue with a thin plot added. The plot involved a producer and performer (Ronny Graham) in financial trouble on opening night. A wealthy Texan offers to help out, on the condition that his daughter be in the show.

The song order was changed and expanded to include:
"Crazy, Man!" (Lynde, Graham)
"Time for Tea" (Carroll, Siegel)
"He Takes Me Off his Income Tax" (de Luce)
"Convention Bound" (Graham)
"Uska Dara" (Kitt)
"C'est si bon" (Kitt)
"Santa Baby" (Kitt)

However, some songs were omitted, or had their lyrics updated.  The song "Nanty Puts her Hair Up" was omitted. However an abridged version was used as an instrumental in a dance routine. The song "Don't Fall Asleep" was omitted. The song "Love is a Simple thing" omitted the final verse, being  the Charles Addams character verse, because it was too outdated. Also, an extra verse was added to "Lizzie Borden".  Some of the lines in "Monotonous" were replaced and updated, omitting the line "Ike Likes Me", and being replaced with writing the "Dragnet" theme instead.

Cast recordingLeonard Sillman's New Faces Of 1952 (Original Cast) was the official release of the cast recording of the Broadway revue New Faces of 1952. The album was originally released on a 12" LP by RCA Victor, LOC-1008. Some material was excluded, as not all songs could fit on the record. In 1977, the album was reissued on the RCA Red Seal label, catalog number CBM1-2206. 

The cast recording, like the play, was produced by Leonard Sillman. The orchestral conductor for the album and play was Anton Coppola. Orchestral arrangements were by Ted Royal. Alice Ghostley, Allen Conroy, Bill Mullikin, Carol Lawrence, Carol Nelson, Eartha Kitt, Jimmy Russell, Joseph Lautner, June Carroll, Michael Dominico, Patricia Hammerlee, Paul Lynde, Robert Clary, Ronny Graham, Rosemary O'Reilly, Virginia Bosler, and Virginia de Luce all perform on the album, and are cited in doing so. The LP also lists some credits for the play itself, John Beal is cited as the show’s director, and the primary sketch writers as Melvin Brooks and Ronny Graham.

In 2003, Jasmine Records reissued the cast album on compact disc for the first time, featuring the original RCA LP track listing. In 2009, Sony Music, which now owns the RCA Victor archive, released the album on CD (catalog number Arkiv RCA-04441) and digital download. This second CD reissue included the previously unreleased song "Time For Tea" performed by June Carroll and Alice Ghostley. 

Track listing
12" Long PlayTrack listings and credits adapted from the original label notes of album, unless other wise specified.''

2009 re-issues
Features previously unreleased song "Time For Tea".

References

External links

1952 musicals
Broadway musicals
Revues